Nicholas Simon Lyndhurst (born 20 April 1961) is an English actor. He began his career as a child actor and became best known for his role as Rodney Trotter in the sitcom Only Fools and Horses (1981–2003). He also had major roles in other sitcoms including Goodnight Sweetheart (1993–1999, 2016) (as Gary Sparrow), Going Straight (1978), Butterflies (1978–1983), The Two of Us (1986–1990), The Piglet Files (1990–1992) and After You've Gone (2007–2008). He starred in the comedy-drama series Rock & Chips (2010–2011) and co-starred in the procedural crime drama series New Tricks (2013–2015).

Lyndhurst won two National Television Awards for his role in Goodnight Sweetheart, as well as being nominated for a British Comedy Award and three British Academy Television Awards for his role in Only Fools and Horses.

Early life
Lyndhurst was born on April 20, 1961, to parents Joe and Liz, and raised in Emsworth, Hampshire. He is the grandson of Francis Lyndhurst, a theatrical scenery painter and film director, who set up an early film studio at Shoreham Fort, Shoreham-by-Sea. He attended East Wittering Primary School. He also attended Corona Theatre School in Hammersmith, London.

Career
Lyndhurst appeared in various television adverts and children's films in the 1970s, before winning the starring role of Tom Canty/Prince Edward in a BBC Television version of The Prince and the Pauper, directed by Barry Letts and transmitted in January 1976. Lyndhurst gained increased national recognition two years later in two BBC sitcom roles, Raymond Fletcher, the teenage son of Ronnie Barker's Norman Stanley Fletcher in Going Straight, and Adam Parkinson, a son of Wendy Craig and Geoffrey Palmer in Carla Lane's Butterflies. 

Lyndhurst achieved national stardom in another BBC sitcom, Only Fools and Horses, in which he played Rodney Trotter, the younger brother of the main character Derek "Del Boy" Trotter, played by David Jason. Only Fools and Horses first aired in 1981 and increased in popularity until it reached its peak in 1996 with its Christmas Day show in the UK. In a BBC poll in 2004, it was voted Britain's Best Sitcom by television viewers. Lyndhurst appeared in the show from the start until its final airing at Christmas 2003.

In 1986, Lyndhurst had a minor part in the film Gunbus/SkyBandits. The film went straight to video and was never seen in British cinemas. During the mid-1980s and 1990s, Lyndhurst also played Ashley Phillips in ITV's The Two of Us which co-starred Janet Dibley and MI5 agent Peter "Piglet" Chapman in The Piglet Files, as well as in a number of stage performances.

From 1993 to 1999, he played the lead character of Gary Sparrow in the time travelling sitcom Goodnight Sweetheart. At around the same time, he was the face and voice on the TV and radio commercials for the telecommunications chain Peoples Phone. Lyndhurst said that he declined an opportunity to play the lead role of Gary in the 1997 British film The Full Monty.

From 1997 to 1999, Lyndhurst was the public face of the stationery chain store WH Smith, starring in their adverts as all four members of one family. He won a BAFTA for his acting in the adverts. In 1999, he played the villainous Uriah Heep opposite Daniel Radcliffe and Dame Maggie Smith in David Copperfield. 

In 2013 he joined the cast as a regular in the BBC Police procedural series New Tricks alongside Dennis Waterman and Tamzin Outhwaite.

In 2016, Lyndhurst revived his Goodnight Sweetheart character Gary Sparrow in a one-off special episode, which aired on 2 September 2016.
In 2017, Lyndhurst played the role of Star Keeper in Rodgers and Hammerstein's Carousel at the English National Opera. In 2019 he played the Governor/Innkeeper in Man of La Mancha for English National Opera at the London Coliseum opposite Kelsey Grammer as Cervantes/Quixote, Danielle de Niese as Aldonza/Dulcinea and Peter Polycarpou as Sancho.

In January 2023, Variety reported that Lyndhurst would be joining the cast of the Frasier revival.

Personal life
Lyndhurst lives in West Wittering, West Sussex, with his wife Lucy, a former ballet dancer. The couple married in Chichester, West Sussex, in 1999. Their son, Archie Lyndhurst (born October 4, 2000) was also an actor appearing in So Awkward. On 22 September 2020, Archie died from acute lymphoblastic leukaemia at the age of 19. In a statement, Lyndhurst said he and his wife were "utterly grief stricken and respectfully request privacy".

Lyndhurst's hobbies include underwater diving, beekeeping and piloting his own aeroplanes.

Filmography

Film

Television

Radio
 My First Planet (2012–2014)

Awards and nominations

References

External links
 
 

1961 births
Living people
British male comedy actors
English male child actors
English male film actors
English male television actors
Male actors from Hampshire
People from Gosport